Forino is a village in the municipality of Gostivar, North Macedonia. Forino's distance is 5.15 km / 3.2 mi away from the center of the municipality.

Demographics
As of the 2021 census, Forino had 2,809 residents with the following ethnic composition:
Albanians 2,710
Persons for whom data are taken from administrative sources 94
Others 5

According to the 2002 census, the village had a total of 4,652 inhabitants. Ethnic groups in the village include:

Albanians 4,624
Serbs 1 
Bosniaks 1
Others 26

Sports
Local football club KF Vardari plays in the Macedonian Second League (West Division).

Notable people
Talat Xhaferi, politician

References

External links

Villages in Gostivar Municipality
Albanian communities in North Macedonia